James Edward Baron, Jr. (born May 23, 1986) is an American former professional basketball player. He played college basketball for the Rhode Island Rams.

Professional career
He graduated from the University of Rhode Island in 2008 and known for his ability to take and make three-point shots.  Jimmy Baron's little brother Billy Baron, played at Canisius college, where his father Jim Baron coaches. He currently holds many Atlantic 10 Conference records. For example, he is the all time Atlantic 10 leader in three-pointers made. He held the freshman record for most three-pointers made for five years, but it was broken in 2010 by Akeem Richmond. In 2009, he played in Turkey for Mersin, in the class A league.

Baron signed a contract with the Lokomotiv Kuban Krasnodar in the summer of 2012. With Lokomotiv Kuban he won the EuroCup in 2013.

On August 24, 2013, Baron signed a one-year contract with the Italian team Virtus Roma. In August 2014, he signed a one-year deal with Baloncesto Fuenlabrada. On January 13, 2015, he left Fuenlabrada. Three days later, he signed with the Turkish team Banvit for the rest of the season.

On August 4, 2015, he signed with the Belgian club Spirou Charleroi for the 2015–16 season.

On August 26, 2016, he signed with Lithuanian club  Neptūnas. On December 6, 2016, Baron scored a record-setting 42 points and 10 three-point field goals in a 103–88 victory over Uşak Sportif in the Basketball Champions League. On February 9, 2017, Baron signed for the rest of the season with the Lithuanian team Lietuvos rytas Vilnius. On August 9, 2018, Baron signed with the French team Champagne Châlons-Reims. During the 2019–20 season he averaged 9.9 points and 1.5 assists per game, shooting 40% from beyond the arc. On September 27, 2020, Baron announced his retirement.

References

External links
 Belgian League profile
 Eurocupbasketball.com profile
 FIBA.com profile
 Rhode Island bio 
 RealGM.com profile

1986 births
Living people
American expatriate basketball people in Belgium
American expatriate basketball people in France
American expatriate basketball people in Italy
American expatriate basketball people in Lithuania
American expatriate basketball people in Russia
American expatriate basketball people in Spain
American expatriate basketball people in Turkey
American men's basketball players
Baloncesto Fuenlabrada players
Bandırma B.İ.K. players
Basketball players from Rhode Island
BC Neptūnas players
BC Rytas players
Champagne Châlons-Reims Basket players
Gipuzkoa Basket players
Liga ACB players
Mersin Büyükşehir Belediyesi S.K. players
Pallacanestro Virtus Roma players
PBC Lokomotiv-Kuban players
People from East Greenwich, Rhode Island
Point guards
Rhode Island Rams men's basketball players
Shooting guards
Spirou Charleroi players